Richard Brian Bowers (born 16 June 1976) is an English cricketer.  Bowers is a right-handed batsman who bowls right-arm medium-fast.  He was born in Redhill, Surrey.

Mansfield represented the Surrey Cricket Board in List A cricket.  His debut List A match came against Surrey in the 2001 Cheltenham & Gloucester Trophy.  From 2001 to 2002, he represented the Board in 4 List A matches, the last of which came against the Essex Cricket Board in the 2nd round of the 2003 Cheltenham & Gloucester Trophy which was held in 2002.  In his 4 List A matches, he took 6 wickets at a bowling average of 24.83, with best figures of 3/50.

References

External links
Richard Bowers at Cricinfo
Richard Bowers at CricketArchive

1976 births
Living people
People from Redhill, Surrey
People from Surrey
English cricketers
Surrey Cricket Board cricketers